Thousand Thoughts (or TT) are a British alternative rock band formed by Ethan Lewis in Enfield, North London. The group consists of lead vocalist Ethan Lewis, guitarist Tom Caine, guitarist William Fox and drummer Adam Field. The band signed to Marshall Records in 2017 and parted ways with Marshall Records in 2021. Their debut EP was released on 29 March 2019.

Band members
Vocals: Ethan Lewis
Guitars: Tom Caine 
Guitars: William Fox
Drums: Adam Field

Past members
Bass: Matt Morrell
Guitar: Jack Botterill 
Drums: Ben Kay

Musical style, influences and band status
Thousand Thoughts musical style has been described as alternative rock. Their music takes on elements of nu-metal, pop-punk and alt-rock, interwoven with themes of tragedy and loss.

The band cite Linkin Park, Bring Me the Horizon, Avenged Sevenfold, Papa Roach and Beartooth as influences. On their debut EP, This One's For You, is influenced by the honesty of "Drown" by Bring Me the Horizon. While "Perspectives" has inspiration from Avenged Sevenfold, Linkin Park and Bring Me the Horizon. "Focus" is inspired by the honest dept of 'Black Hole Sun' by Soundgarden and "Ignite" was inspired by the rhythmic flow of "My Curse" by Killswitch Engage.

Discography
Their single "This One's for You" was released on 22 June 2018 and their next single, "Perspectives", was released on 9 November 2018. Both were included on their self-titled EP, Thousand Thoughts, which released on 29 March 2019, also including the tracks "Focus" and "Ignite".

Their single "Saviour" was released on 27 September 2019. Vocalist Ethan Smith explains this track as 'the voice of a broken generation,' and acts as a sequel to 'This One's For You.'

Their single, "Change", was released on 25 October 2019, which featured Daigo Jax, a nu-metal/hip-hop rapper, which made his first ever studio appearance on the track.

Tours 
Ethan Lewis, Matt Morrell and Jack Botterill from Thousand Thoughts performed an acoustic set supporting Press to MECO on their London tour dates of their acoustic tour.

 London Sixty Six Sounds: 5 March 2019
 London Sixty Six Sounds: 6 March 2019

Thousand Thoughts are supporting Inklings on a tour throughout the UK in 2019.

 Manchester The Castle Hotel: 29 October 2019
 Birmingham, Asylum 2: 30 October 2019
 London, Thousand Island: 3 November 2019

Thousand Thoughts opened for Bad Wolves on 29 January 2020 at Academy Islington in London.

References

External links
 Official Website

British alternative rock groups